This is a list of years in the Czech Republic.

20th century

21st century

See also
 Timeline of Brno
 Key dates in Ostrava's history
 Timeline of Prague

Further reading
 
 

 
Czech Republic history-related lists
Czech Republic